The 1910 World Greco-Roman Wrestling Championship were held in Düsseldorf, Germany in June 1910.

Medal table

Medal summary

Men's Greco-Roman

References
FILA Database

World Wrestling Championships
W
1910
W